The Wu Kwai Sha Youth Village is a beach camp in Wu Kai Sha, Ma On Shan, Sha Tin, New Territories, operated by the Chinese Y M C A of Hong Kong.

History
The camp was originally constructed in 1955 as the "Children's Village in Wu Kai Sha" (烏溪沙兒童新村), when it was an orphanage, or orphan's village, with up to 1,000 children. The orphanage and children's hospital services ceased in 1971 after which the land was handed over to the Chinese Y M C A of Hong Kong to develop into a holiday camp and beach resort, and renamed Chinese Y M C A of Hong Kong Wu Kai Sha Youth Village. When the camp was opened there was no road access, and the only transport was a kaito service from the Wu Kai Sha Public Pier to Ma Liu Shui. In the 1980s, roads were constructed.

Features
The campsite comprises an area of 11 hectares, and can accommodate up to 1,100 residential campers and 1,000 day campers.

Gallery

References

Wu Kai Sha
YMCA Summer Camps